Lohorung, also spelled Lorung, Lohrung or Loharung, is a Kirati language of eastern Nepal. It has been described by George van Driem.

Southern Lorung is also considered to be Southern Yamphu language. These varieties are all closely related.

Geographical distribution
Lohorung is spoken between the middle Arun valley and the Sabhakhola in central Sankhuwasabha District, Kosi Zone, in the villages of Pangma, Angala, Higuwa, Khorande, Bardeu, Gairiaula, Malta, Sitalpati, and Dhupu (Ethnologue).

Southern Yamphu (Southern Lohorung) is spoken in Bodhe, Mounabudhuk, Bhedetar, and Rajaran villages in Dhankuta District, Kosi Zone (Ethnologue). It is also spoken in Devitar and Matsya Pokhari villages, northern Sankhuwasabha District, which are located south of the Tamorkhola, east of the Jaruwakhola and west of the Raghuwkhola. Dialects are Gessa and Yamphe (also known as Newahang Yamphe, Yakkhaba, Yakkhaba Khap, Yamphe Kha).

References

External links
Online Lohorung language dictionary

Kiranti languages
Lohorung
Languages of Nepal
Languages of Koshi Province